Lê Quý Đôn (1726–1784) was an 18th-century  Vietnamese poet, encyclopedist, and government official. His pseudonym was Quế - Đường. He was a native of Duyen Ha village in present-day Thái Bình Province. He is considered one of the most outstanding and prolific Vietnamese polymath of the early modern period.

Life
Lê was born in the province of Thái Bình, and lived in the reign of Emperor Lê Hiển Tông.
The period of his life was marked by a split between the Trịnh lords of the north and the Nguyễn lords, in the aftermath of an examination system scandal involving his son Lê Quý Kiêt (who was sent to prison for changing examination books), had been ordered south of the Linh Giang River to serve as an official ...As a member of the Trịnh lords' bureaucracy, Lê Quý Đôn was supposed to help restore civil government in a region of Viet Nam that had been separate from the Trịnh lords' control for over two centuries, and facilitate the reincorporation of"</ref>

In 1760, Lê Quý Đôn went to China as an ambassador. He later served as a government official in the ministries of war, finance and public works. He also served as the rector of the National University situated in the Văn Miếu in Hanoi and as Director of the Bureau of Annals. 
It is said that Lê was traveling with some Qing officials, and along the way they saw a Chinese poem inscribed on a stone palette. Later, one of the Qing officials, to test his merit, asked him if he could remember what was on the stone palette. Lê recited the entire poem, word for word, in Chinese. That earned him a great deal of respect from the Chinese.

Writings
Lê Quý Đôn was responsible for a large number of encyclopedic, historical, bibliographical, and philosophical works.
It is estimated that he has the largest volume of works among Vietnamese literature using Chinese characters (about 40 series with hundreds of volumes).

 The Vân đài loại ngữ (Classified Sayings, 9 volumes) is Vietnam's largest encyclopedia, a landmark in Vietnamese science in the Confucian era. 
 The history Đại Việt thông sử (30 volumes) contains many documents about the Lê dynasty.
 The Phủ biên tạp lục (Frontier Chronicles) (6 volumes) was a detailed description of Nguyễn territories in Thuận Hóa and Quảng Nam Provinces.

Legacy

Today, one of largest technical universities in Hanoi, Le Quy Don Technical University (LeTech), and many schools in Vietnam are named after him. Most cities in Vietnam have named major streets after him.

Le Quy Don High School in District 3 is the first high school to be established in Saigon, Vietnam. The school was built in 1874 and it has been fostering generation of students up until this day. Despite being over a century old, Le Quy Don High School is still able to maintain most its original architectures. The school's location in central Saigon makes it one of the most popular spots for filming.

Finally, "Lê Quý Đôn″ is also the name of a new Vietnamese sail training ship, built in 2015 by the Polish ship yard Marine Projects Ltd. on behalf of Polish Defence Holding in Gdynia. Some of its data: overall length: 65.0 m, breadth: 10.0 m, air draft: 42.0 m, sails area: 1395 m2, propulsion: 880 kW, crew and cadets: 30 + 80 persons.

References

External links

Vietnamese Confucianists
Vietnamese male poets
18th-century Vietnamese philosophers
People from Thái Bình province
Lê dynasty officials
Mandarins of the Trịnh lords
1726 births
1784 deaths
18th-century Vietnamese poets
Lê dynasty poets
Lê dynasty writers